Tarikh or Tarikh: A Timeline (2019) is an Indian Bengali film directed by Churni Ganguly and bankrolled by Suparnokanti Karati. This was the second film directed by Ganguly after Nirbashito. The film starring Saswata Chatterjee, Ritwick Chakraborty and Raima Sen, portrays dichotomies of human existence. The film was awarded the best Screenplay for dialogues in the 66th National Film Awards.The film was released on 12 April 2019.

Plot 
The film narrates a story of three individuals: Anirban Gupta, a professor, Ira, Anirban's wife, works as a hotel lobby manager, and Rudrangshu (Rudy), Anirban's childhood friend.

Cast 
 Saswata Chatterjee as Anirban Gupta
 Raima Sen as Ira
 Ritwick Chakraborty as Rudrangshu (Rudy),

Release and reception 
The film released on 12 April 2019. Firstpost gave the film 3.5 out of 5 stars and commented: "Tarikh is an exceptionally well-written film". . . and "also an excellent study of the preaching and practising of such values as socialism." Indian Express Limited also rated 3.5 stars out of five. Cinestaan rated the film 2 out of 5 stars and wrote: "Despite the engaging performances, the film tends to disturb you but hardly offers anything to ponder. "

References 

Films whose writer won the Best Dialogue National Film Award
Bengali-language Indian films
2010s Bengali-language films